Tamar Seideman is the Dow Chemical Company Professor of Chemistry and Professor of Physics at Northwestern University. She specialises in coherence spectroscopies and coherent control in isolated molecules and dissipative media as well as in ultrafast nanoplasmonics, current-driven phenomena in nanoelectronics  and mathematical models.

Early life and education 
Seideman was born in Israel. She studied chemistry at the Tel Aviv University and graduated suma cum laude with a bachelor's degree in 1982. She joined the Weizmann Institute of Science for her doctoral studies and earned her PhD under the supervision of Moshe Shapiro in 1990. Her doctoral work considered the quantum theory of laser catalysis. Seideman was made a Weizmann Fellow and a Fulbright Program Fellow at University of California, Berkeley. Here she worked with William H. Miller on mathematical method development. In 1992 she joined the Ames Research Center as a Principal Investigator before being appointed a research associate at the National Research Council of Canada in 1993.

Research and career 
Seideman was made an associate research officer at the National Research Council of Canada in 1996. She was cross-appointed as a professor of chemistry at Queen's University. Here she developed the concepts of nonadiabatic alignment and molecular focusing in laser fields and the theory of time-resolved photoelectron angular distributions. She collaborated with experimentalist coworkers on the problem of the molecular phase in two-pathway excitation experiments and on current-triggered surface nanochemistry. 

Seideman was made a professor of chemistry at Northwestern University in 2003. Here she develops and applies quantum mechanical theories  to understand phenomena including quantum transport and current-induced dynamics in molecular electronic devices; ultrafast nanoplasmonics and information guidance in the nanoscale; attosecond science and the interaction of matter with intense laser fields; and coherent control and coherence spectroscopies in isolated molecules and in
dissipative media.  In other research, Seideman has explored coherent control of molecular dynamics and its extension to control of transport in the nanoscale. She proposed that current in nanoscale constructs can  be used to drive  molecular machines. Additionally, she has demonstrated it is possible to use a scanning tunnelling microscope to control surface reactions. In related work, Seideman showed that one can guide light using nanoparticle arrays to create custom nanoplasmonics. 

Her recent work has developed theoretical and computational models to control the nanoscale properties of material systems. This has included an investigation of charge transport through molecular and nanoscale electronic materials in an effort to improve the efficiency of solar cells.  To understand charge transport mechanisms, she has studied optically induced tunnelling through junctions. Her best known research is in the area of laser alignment. Originally introduced for isolated small molecules, this was recently extended to nonrigid molecules. dissipative media and condensed matter systems. In disordered assembly, the laser field can impart long-range orientational order to molecular layers. In dense molecular assemblies, alignment can become a collective phenomenon with long range translational and orientational order. In polyatomic molecules alignment can be used to control torsional motions with a variety of new applications, including control of charge transport, energy transfer, axial chirality and reactivity.  Seideman takes annually a visiting professor position at the Weizmann Institute of Science.

Awards and honours 
Her awards and honours include;

 Member of the German Academy of Sciences Leopoldina, Halle, Germany
 Fellow of the American Physical Society
 Fellow of the John Simon Guggenheim Memorial Foundation
 Senior A. von Humboldt Research Award, Berlin, Germany
 Sackler Visiting Award, Tel-Aviv, Israel
 University of Hamburg Mildred Dresselhaus Award, Hamburg, Germany
 Weizmann Institute of Science Weston Professorship, Rehovot, Israel
 Journal of Physical Chemistry Celebration of Women Chemists
 Wegner Award, Haifa, Israel
 Fulbright Research Award, University of California Berkeley
 Chaim Weizmann Fellowship, University of California Berkeley
 J. F. Kennedy Award, Rehovot, Israel
 Daniel Brener Award, Rehovot, Israel
 Knesset of Israel Award, Jerusalem, Israel

Selected publication 

She is the author of 311 publications, including;

References 

Israeli women chemists
1959 births
Fellows of the American Physical Society
Weizmann Institute of Science alumni
Tel Aviv University alumni
Northwestern University faculty
Academic staff of Queen's University at Kingston
Living people
Members of the German Academy of Sciences Leopoldina